Anna Agustina de Jesús Ramírez Heredia (1813 - 1879) was a Mexican national hero which gave her 12 sons to Benito Juárez, the 26th president of Mexico, to defend the Mexican Republic from a French intervention. She was more commonly known as "La dama del ropaje negro".

Biography 
Anna Agustina de Jesús Ramírez Heredia was born in Mocorito, Sinaloa in 1813. She married the soldier Severiano Rodríguez, who gave her 13 sons and died in 1859. In the defense of the Republic, 12 out of her 13 sons died between 1863 and 1866. After the death of her sons, she lived in absolute poverty in Mazatlán.

She died on the 14 February 1879 from a fever. Her mortal remains were deposited in a common grave in the civil Pantheon of Mazatlán.

Legacy 
In 1958, Sinaloa's governor Gabriel Leyva issued an order to impose that her name be inscribed in gold in the Session Hall of the State Congress. The same year, a monument of hers was built, which is located in the capital of Sinaloa, on the intersection of Bravo and Madero streets.

In her honor, the "Agustina Ramírez State Award for Social Merit" was created in Mexico. It is awarded each year to women who have stood out for the community.

For having allowed her sons to sacrifice themselves for the republic, some historians like Eustaquio Buelna describe her as "The greatest heroine in Mexico".

Her sons 

 Librado
 Francisco
 José María
 Victorio
 Antonio
 Juan José
 Juan Bautista
 Jesús
 Francisco
 Francisco
 Apolonio
 Segundo

References 

1813 births
1879 deaths
19th-century Mexican women
People from Mocorito
Mexican nurses